Garth Brooks & the Magic of Christmas is the second holiday album by American country music artist Garth Brooks. It was released on November 23, 1999, peaked at number seven on the Billboard 200 chart, and number one on the Top Country Albums chart. Two years after this album's release, Brooks released a reissue of this album, Songs from Call Me Claus, which contained most of the songs from this release.  The only tracks which were not carried over were "White Christmas", "God Rest Ye Merry, Gentlemen", and "Go Tell It on the Mountain" (all of which are remixed versions of the same songs from his first Christmas album, Beyond the Season).

Track listing
"It's the Most Wonderful Time of the Year" (Edward Pola, George Wyle) – 2:57
"Let It Snow! Let It Snow! Let It Snow!" (Sammy Cahn, Jule Styne) – 2:06
"The Christmas Song" (Mel Tormé, Bob Wells) – 3:25
"White Christmas" (Irving Berlin) – 2:58
"Baby Jesus Is Born" (Randy Handley, Cam King) – 3:59
"God Rest Ye Merry, Gentlemen" (traditional) – 2:35
"Winter Wonderland" (Felix Bernard, Richard B. Smith) – 3:33
"Sleigh Ride" (Leroy Anderson, Mitchell Parish) – 3:27
"Have Yourself a Merry Little Christmas" (Ralph Blane, Hugh Martin) – 4:05
"(There's No Place Like) Home for the Holidays (Robert Allen, Al Stillman) – 2:18
"Silver Bells" (Ray Evans, Jay Livingston) – 3:34
"Go Tell It on the Mountain" (traditional, work) – 3:25
"The Wise Men's Journey" [instrumental] (Bobby Wood) – 1:28
"O Little Town of Bethlehem" (Phillips Brooks, Lewis Redner) – 3:03

Personnel 
 Garth Brooks – vocals, arrangements (6, 12, 14)
 Bobby Wood – keyboards
 Blair Masters – Hammond B3 organ (5, 12)
 Mark Casstevens – acoustic guitars
 Chris Leuzinger – electric guitars
 Mike Chapman – bass
 Milton Sledge – drums
 Sam Bacco – percussion
 Dennis Burnside – horn and string arrangements, conductor 
 Mark Douthit, Don Jackson, Sam Levine, Doug Moffet and Denis Solee – saxophones and woodwinds
 Ernie Collins, Chris Dunn, Robert Green and Chris McDonald – trombone 
 Jeff Bailey, Mike Haynes, Steve Patrick and George Tidwell – trumpet, flugelhorn 
 Carl Gorodetzky – string contractor 
 The Nashville String Machine – strings
 Bergen White – choir arrangements and conductor 
 The Bergen White Choir – choir

Production 
 Allen Reynolds – producer 
 Mark Miller – recording, mixing 
 Matt Andrews – recording assistant 
 Duke Duczer – recording assistant, mix assistant 
 Eric Conn – digital editing
 Carlos Grier – digital editing
 Denny Purcell – mastering at Georgetown Masters (Nashville, Tennessee).
 Jonathan Russell – mastering assistant 
 Carlton Davis – production manager 
 Denise Jarvis – production managing assistant  
 Virginia Team – art direction 
 Jerry Joyner – design 
 Beverly Parker – photography 
 Harris Graphics – digital imagery
 Mary Beth Felts – hair, make-up

Chart performance
Garth Brooks & the Magic of Christmas peaked at number seven on the U.S. Billboard 200, and peaked at number one on Top Country Albums, his 10th number-one album.

Weekly charts

Singles

Year-end charts

Sales and certifications

References and external links

Garth Brooks albums
1999 Christmas albums
Christmas albums by American artists
Albums produced by Allen Reynolds
Capitol Records Christmas albums
Country Christmas albums